Las dos Dianas is a Venezuelan telenovela written by José Ignacio Cabrujas and produced by Marte Televisión in 1992.

Carlos Mata and Nohely Arteaga starred as the main protagonists.

Cast
 Carlos Mata as Diego Morales / Gabriel Morales
 Nohely Arteaga as Diana Burgos / Dianita Moncada Burgos
 Lupita Ferrer as Catalina Arismendi de Moncada
 Astrid Carolina Herrera as Jimena
 Julio Pereira as Alfredo Cedeño
 Raquel Castaños as Dulce
 Herminia Martínez as La Danta Carmona
 Rodolfo Drago as Dr.Miranda
 Pedro Renteria as Francisco Monacada
 Luis de Mozos as Leandro
 Lourdes Valera as Rosita Vilariño
 Marlene Maseda as Isabel Moncada
 Lino Ferrer as Martin Paz /  Martin Guerra
 Manuel Salazar as Enrique Moncada
 Miguel Ferrari as Mercurio Calderon
 Zamira Segura as Lutecia
 Natalia Fuenmayor as Eloisa
 Javier Paredes as Balbino Cedeño
 Gioia Arismendi as Dianita niña

References

External links
Las dos Dianas at the Internet Movie Database

1992 telenovelas
Venezuelan telenovelas
1992 Venezuelan television series debuts
1992 Venezuelan television series endings
Spanish-language telenovelas
Television shows set in Venezuela